Wolverton and Greenleys is a civil parish  with a town council in Milton Keynes, England.  It is north-west of Central Milton Keynes, and according to the 2011 census had a population of 12,492.  It includes Wolverton, Old Wolverton, Wolverton Mill, Greenleys and Stonebridge.

The parish is bounded to the north by the River Great Ouse, to the east by the West Coast railway line, to the south by the Millers Way (H2) grid road, and to the west by the A5.

The parish was formed in 2001 as part of a general creation of parishes in the unparished part of Milton Keynes.

At its southeast corner, it contains the Milton Keynes Museum which includes the Stacey Hill collection of rural life and many memorabilia of the nearby Wolverton railway works.

References

Civil parishes in Buckinghamshire
Wolverton